The 1937 European Amateur Boxing Championships were held in Milan, Italy from 5 to 9 May. It was the fifth edition of the competition, organised by the European governing body for amateur boxing, EABA. There were 85 fighters from 16 countries participating.

Medal winners

Medal table

References

External links
European Championships
Results
EABA Boxing

1937 in boxing
1937
International boxing competitions hosted by Italy
1937 in Italian sport
May 1937 sports events
Sports competitions in Milan
1937 Amateur Boxing European Championships